Leonat Vitija (born 22 August 2000) is a Kosovar footballer who plays as centre-back for Albanian club KF Skënderbeu Korçë.

References

2000 births
Living people
Sportspeople from Pristina
Kosovo Albanians
Kosovan people of Albanian descent
Association football defenders
Kosovan footballers
Albanian footballers
Kosovo under-21 international footballers
KF KEK players
FC Prishtina players
KF Skënderbeu Korçë players
Expatriate footballers in Albania
Kosovan expatriate footballers
Kosovan expatriates in Albania
Football Superleague of Kosovo players
Kategoria Superiore players